is a six-part Japanese animated spy action film series and a sequel to the 2017 anime television series Princess Principal. Produced by Actas and distributed by Showgate, the film series is directed by Masaki Tachibana from a script written by Noboru Kimura and stars Aoi Koga, Akira Sekine, Yō Taichi, Akari Kageyama, and Nozomi Furuki.

The film follows Ange, Princess Charlotte, Dorothy, Beatrice, and Chise Tōdō,  members of Team White Pigeon, as they are assigned to investigate Bishop, the Commonwealth spy within the Kingdom's royal family, for his loyalty. Following his death from an assailant and an assassination attempt on Prince Richard, the team is tasked to find the Cavorite bombs that are stolen from the Commonwealth. After the incident of missing bombs, Richard, the mastermind behind the recent events, invites Charlotte to join him for his plan to reform the Kingdom.

A sequel to the anime series was announced in April 2018. The staff and cast for the first film in the series were revealed in September 2019, with Koga replacing Ayaka Imamura as the voice actress for Ange due to the latter's health condition. That film's production was completed in March 2020. The staff and cast for the second film in the series were revealed in July 2021, while its production was completed in August. The staff and cast for the third film in the series were revealed in November 2022.

Two films in the series have been released in Japan since 2021: Princess Principal: Crown Handler – Chapter 1 on February 11, 2021, and Princess Principal: Crown Handler – Chapter 2 on September 23. The film series has grossed million in Japan. The third film in the series, Princess Principal: Crown Handler – Chapter 3, is set to be released in Japan on April 7, 2023.

Films

Chapter 1
In response to the assassination attempt on the Queen, the Duke of Normandy begins cracking down on suspected Commonwealth of Albion spies. Concerned that their mole within the royal family may be a double agent, Control tasks the Team White Pigeon with making contact with the mole and investigating him. Ange disguises herself as Princess Charlotte and meets the mole in the royal palace, and is surprised to discover that the mole is Winston, the grand chamberlain and the man that used to take care of her when she was a child. Winston recognizes Ange and lets her know that he is aware she is the real Charlotte and the other is an impostor. Ange and Charlotte explain to the rest of the team that he knows they are investigating him. Despite knowing the risk of Winston exposing them, the team continues to investigate him and discovers that Winston has been secretly communicating with an unknown third party through coded messages he has hidden in the Queen's speeches. The team manages to expose him by feeding him false information and tricking him into sending out a message they can intercept. Control orders the team to detain Winston for interrogation, but Ange secretly arranges for his escape in return for keeping her and Charlotte's secret. Winston parts amicably with Ange but is shot by an assassin. With his dying words, Winston warns Ange that if she continues living a life of lies, she will end up like him. In the aftermath, both the Duke of Normandy and Control become aware of the unknown third party's involvement as the team feels defeated in failing to save Winston.

Chapter 2
The Commonwealth tests a new and destructive Cavorite bomb which they intend to use against the Kingdom of Albion. Meanwhile, Prince Richard returns to the Kingdom but is injured in an assassination attempt. Control gives Team White Pigeon a new mission to search for three Cavorite bombs that were stolen from the Commonwealth and smuggled into the Kingdom, with the concern that those bombs may be used to instigate a war between both nations. Following a lead, the team investigates the Vegas Steam Theater and finds the bombs hidden there. They then put the theater under surveillance while they wait for Control to organize a retrieval team. However, when the surveillance teams are killed by the assassin, Ange, Dorothy, and Chise Tōdō have no choice but to raid the theater. They manage to capture the smuggler and recover two of the bombs, but they find out the third one has been smuggled onto a yacht where a royal ceremony is being held with Charlotte, Beatrice, and Princess Mary present. With Ange's quick thinking, they manage to stop the bomb from detonating and prevent it from falling into the Kingdom's hands. Charlotte returns to the royal palace, only to discover Prince Edward has been assassinated. She comes across Prince Richard, who admits he was behind the bomb plot and Prince Edward's death as he wants to seize power and reform the Kingdom. He then asks Charlotte whether she will join him or not.

Cast and staff

Voice cast
The table shows the Japanese voice cast (green-colored cells) of the three films in the Princess Principal: Crown Handler series and the English dub cast (white-colored cells) of the series' first two films.

Staff

Production
A sequel to the 2017 anime television series Princess Principal was announced during the Princess Principal Stage of Mission live event for the anime series in April 2018, which would comprise six films. Anime series director Masaki Tachibana and chief producer Atsushi Yukawa agreed on making films as a sequel because they found doing another television series "physically demanding". Ayaka Imamura, who voiced Ange in the anime series, announced her retirement in June 2018 due to declining health. The film's production staff and committee collaborated with her talent agency With Line to begin auditions for the role. The film series' full title was revealed in September 2019.

The staff for the first film in the series, Princess Principal: Crown Handler – Chapter 1, were revealed in September 2019. Noboru Kimura was revealed to be writing the script for the film instead of Ichirō Ōkouchi, who wrote the anime series. Actas was solely credited for the production as opposed to the collaboration they had with Studio 3Hz in the anime series. Additionally, Aoi Koga was revealed as the new voice actress for Ange, with Akira Sekine, Yō Taichi, Akari Kageyama, and Nozomi Furuki reprising their role as Princess Charlotte, Dorothy, Beatrice, and Chise Tōdō, respectively. The films James Bond, Mission: Impossible, and Charlie's Angels influenced Chapter 1, but Tachibana used Tinker Tailor Soldier Spy (2011) to accomplish "a realistic spy story". While working on the script, Kimura was inspired by the American television series The Blacklist since he was interested on how "the drama and the development [of the series] mesh well". Actas' president Shunpei Maruyama announced the completion of the film's production in March 2020 despite the ongoing COVID-19 pandemic. Tachibana likened the action scene at the double-deck bus to Jackie Chan's 1985 film Police Story. Sentai Filmworks revealed the English dub cast for the film in February 2022.

The staff and cast for the second film in the series, Princess Principal: Crown Handler – Chapter 2, were revealed in July 2021. Maruyama announced the completion of the film's production in August 2021. Teruyuki Tanzawa, Rina Endō, and Kazuyuki Okitsu were announced in September 2021 as the respective voices of Prince Edward, Princess Mary, and Prince Richard, who were initially revealed in July. The dragon Smerg from Michael Ende's 1979 novel The Neverending Story influenced the Steam Dragon animatronics in the film. In August 2022, Sentai Filmworks revealed the film would receive an English dub upon their release of the details about its Blu-ray release.

The production for the third film in the series, Princess Principal: Crown Handler – Chapter 3, was announced in September 2021. Tachibana stated the film would help the viewers to "finally begin to understand the meaning of the title Crown Handler". The staff and cast for the film were revealed in November 2022.

Music
Yuki Kajiura, who previously composed for the anime series Princess Principal, was reported to be composing Princess Principal: Crown Handler in September 2019. The opening theme music for the film series, "Lies & Ties", was revealed in October 2019 by Void_Chords, featuring Yui Mugino. Masami Shimoda served as the director of the film's opening video after declining the initial offer to become the episode director of the eleventh episode of the anime series due to conflicting schedule. The ending theme music for the film series, "Nowhere Land", was revealed in January 2020, and it was performed by Koga as Ange, Sekine as Princess Charlotte, Taichi as Dorothy, Kageyama as Beatrice, and Furuki as Chise. On April 8, 2020, the two singles were released in Japan by the record label Lantis. The insert song for Princess Principal: Crown Handler – Chapter 2 titled "Fairy Game" was revealed in August 2021, with FictionJunction and Shuri performing it.

Marketing
A teaser visual and trailer for Princess Principal: Crown Handler – Chapter 1 were released in September 2019. The main visual by the character designer and chief animation director Kimitake Nishio and a new trailer for the first film in the series were released in February 2020. In preparation for the upcoming release of the film, Misato Fukuen narrated twelve videos each summarising every episode of the anime series in one minute, which were released on the official YouTube channel of Bandai Namco Arts on January 31, 2021. A trailer and the main visual for Princess Principal: Crown Handler – Chapter 2 were released in July 2021. The first 10 minutes of the second film in the series was released by Bandai Namco Arts on September 27, 2021. A trailer for Princess Principal: Crown Handler – Chapter 3 was shown at the end of Chapter 2, following its main visual and another trailer in November.

Promotion partners for the film series included Dash Store, the Girls und Panzers smartphone game Girls und Panzer: Great Tankery Operation!, the anime and manga merchandise manufacturer Amnibus, Don Quijote, GraffArt Shop, and GraffArt Cafe.

Release

Theatrical
Princess Principal: Crown Handler – Chapter 1 was released in Japan on February 11, 2021. The film was previously scheduled to be released in 2019, before it was shifted to April 10, 2020, and then to the February 2021 premiere due to COVID-19 pandemic. Princess Principal: Crown Handler – Chapter 2 was released in Japan on September 23, 2021. The two films were screened as one in the Shinjuku Wald 9 theater in Japan on March 12, 2022. Princess Principal: Crown Handler – Chapter 3 is set to be released in Japan on April 7, 2023.

Home media
Hidive began streaming Princess Principal: Crown Handler – Chapter 1 on May 26, 2021. The film was released on Blu-ray in Japan on September 28, 2021. It is bundled with a 6-minute original video animation (OVA) titled "Busy Easy Money", a special program first delivered on Niconico and YouTube called "Pri-Pri Secret Meeting Super", and Fukuen's 1-minute narrated recap of each Princess Principal episode. Sentai Filmworks released the film on Blu-ray in the United States and Canada on March 15, 2022. MVM Entertainment released it in the United Kingdom and Ireland on August 8, 2022.

Princess Principal: Crown Handler – Chapter 2 was released on Blu-ray in Japan on March 29, 2022. It is bundled with a new OVA titled "Revealing Reviews" and the second part of the special program "Pri-Pri Secret Meeting Super". Sentai Filmworks released the film on Blu-ray in the United States and Canada on November 22, 2022. MVM Entertainment released its Blu-ray collector's edition in the United Kingdom and Ireland on November 28, 2022. Hidive began streaming the film on February 21, 2023.

The first two films in the series began streaming on Anime Hōdai, J:COM On Demand, d Anime Store, Bandai Channel, Hulu, Milplus, and U-NEXT in Japan on December 23, 2022. They aired on Wowow Prime on February 2, 2023, and are set to be broadcast on Tokyo MX on April 9.

Reception

Box office
Princess Principal: Crown Handler – Chapter 1 grossed million and Princess Principal: Crown Handler – Chapter 2 grossed million in Japan, bringing the total box office for the film series to million (million).

Critical response
The Japanese review and survey firm Filmarks reported that Princess Principal: Crown Handler – Chapter 2 had an approval rating of 4.05, based on 129 reviews, placing the film third in their first-day satisfaction ranking.

Accolade
In December 2021, the first two films in the Princess Principal: Crown Handler series were among the Top 100 Favorites nominated for the Anime of the Year at the Tokyo Anime Award Festival 2022.

Original video animations

Note

References

External links
  
 
 
 
 

2021 anime films
2023 anime films
Actas
Animated films set in London
Anime action films
Anime films composed by Yuki Kajiura
Anime postponed due to the COVID-19 pandemic
Film series introduced in 2021
Films postponed due to the COVID-19 pandemic
Films set in a fictional country
Japanese sequel films
Japanese-language films
Sentai Filmworks
Showgate films
Spy film series